Pebble Hill, also known as Capell, is an unincorporated community in Wilcox County, Alabama, United States.

History
A post office operated under the name Capell from 1895 to 1915.

References

Unincorporated communities in Alabama
Unincorporated communities in Wilcox County, Alabama